Violator may refer to:

 Violator (album), a 1990 album by Depeche Mode
 Violator (band), a Brazilian thrash metal band
 Violator (comics), a comic book character who appeared in Todd McFarlane's Spawn
 Violator (company), a hip-hop/R&B management firm, record label
Violator: The Album
Violator: The Album, V2.0
 Violator (film), a 2014 Philippine film

See also
The Violators, 1957 film
Violation (disambiguation)